Lysinibacillus xylanilyticus is a Gram-positive, aerobic, xylan-degrading, endospore-forming and motile bacterium from the genus of Lysinibacillus which has been isolated from forest humus from the Gyeryong Mountain.

References

Bacillaceae
Bacteria described in 2010